Alberto Gallo may refer to:

 Alberto Enríquez Gallo (1894–1962), President of Ecuador, 1937–1938
 Alberto Gallo (footballer) (born 1975), Italian retired footballer
 Alberto Gallo (fund manager) (born 1983), Italian fund manager

See also
 Albert Gallo (born 1930), New York mobster